Craig Alan Barlow (born July 23, 1972) is an American professional golfer.

Barlow was born in Henderson, Nevada. He turned professional in 1995. He played on the PGA Tour and Nationwide Tour from 1998 to 2011.

Barlow is a cousin of Brandon Flowers who is the lead singer of The Killers.

Results in major championships

Note: Barlow never played in the Masters Tournament.

CUT = missed the half-way cut
"T" = tied

See also
1997 PGA Tour Qualifying School graduates
1998 PGA Tour Qualifying School graduates
2000 PGA Tour Qualifying School graduates
2004 PGA Tour Qualifying School graduates

References

External links

American male golfers
PGA Tour golfers
Golfers from Nevada
People from Henderson, Nevada
1972 births
Living people